Rafael Nadal defeated Robin Söderling in the final, 6–4, 6–2, 6–4 to win the men's singles tennis title at the 2010 French Open. It was his fifth French Open title and his seventh major title overall. Nadal won the title without dropping a set for the second time (the first being in 2008). By winning the title, Nadal regained the world No. 1 ranking from Roger Federer, who was in contention to break Pete Sampras' record of 286 weeks spent with the top position.

Federer was the defending champion but lost in the quarterfinals to Söderling in a rematch of the previous year's final. This was the first time since the 2004 French Open that Federer did not reach the semifinals of a major, a span of 23 majors. Federer was attempting to become the first man in the Open Era and the third man ever to achieve a double career Grand Slam. Between the 2004 Wimbledon Championships and the 2017 Australian Open, this was the only major not to feature either Federer or Novak Djokovic in the semifinals. Djokovic's quarterfinal match against Jurgen Melzer marked the only time he lost a grand slam match after leading two sets to love.

Seeds

Qualifying

Draw

Finals

Top half

Section 1

Section 2

Section 3

Section 4

Bottom half

Section 5

Section 6

Section 7

Section 8

References

External links
Official Roland Garros 2010 Men's Singles Draw
Main Draw
2010 French Open – Men's draws and results at the International Tennis Federation

Men's Singles
French Open by year – Men's singles
French Open